Gucheng, formerly romanized as Ku Ch'eng, may refer to the following places in China:

Gucheng meaning "old city/fort" (古城)

Communities
Gucheng, Chengzhong, Chengzhong Subdistrict, Yingcheng, Xiaogan, Hubei

Counties
Qitai County (formerly ) in the Changji Hui Autonomous Prefecture, Xinjiang, one of the more famous sites named Gucheng

Towns
Gucheng, Bozhou, in Anhui
Gucheng, Feidong County, in Anhui
Gucheng, Fuchuan County, in Guangxi
Gucheng, Luchuan County, in Guangxi
Gucheng, Fujian
Gucheng, Gansu, in Liangzhou District, Wuwei
Gucheng, Fucheng County, in Hebei
Gucheng, Keshan County, in Heilongjiang
Gucheng, Linkou County, in Heilongjiang
Gucheng, Xuchang, in Yuzhou, Henan
Gucheng, Bayan Nur, in the Linhe District of Bayan Nur, Inner Mongolia
Gucheng, Togtoh County, in Togtoh County, Inner Mongolia
Gucheng, Jiangxi, in Jinggangshan City, Jiangxi
Gucheng, Huanren County, in Liaoning
Gucheng, Pengyang County, in Ningxia
Gucheng, Wuzhong, in Litong District in Ningxia
Gucheng, Luonan County, in Shaanxi
Gucheng, Xixiang County, in Shaanxi
Gucheng, Shen County, in Shandong
Gucheng, Zhanhua County, in Shandong
Gucheng, Shanyin County, in Shanxi
Gucheng, Xiangfen County, in Shanxi
Gucheng, Yanggao County, in Shanxi
Gucheng, Yuanqu County, in Shanxi
Gucheng, Pi County, in Sichuan
Gucheng, Pingwu County, in Sichuan

Districts
Gucheng District (古城区), Lijiang, Yunnan

Townships

 Gucheng Township, Huaiyuan County, in Anhui
 Gucheng Township, Yingshang County, in Anhui
 Changgucheng Township (长古城乡) in Baoding, Hebei
 Xigucheng Township in Xingtai, Hebei
 Gucheng Township, Da'an, Jilin
 Gucheng Township, Fugou County, in Henan
 Gucheng Township, Huaibin County, in Henan
 Gucheng Township, Luoyang, in Henan
 Gucheng Township, Qingfeng County, in Henan
 Gucheng Township, Tanghe County, in Henan
 Gucheng Township, Zhumadian, in Henan

Subdistricts
Gucheng Subdistrict, Beijing, in Shijingshan District, Beijing
Gucheng Subdistrict, Dengzhou, in Dengzhou City, Henan
Gucheng Subdistrict, Shangqiu, in Suiyang District, Shangqiu, Henan
Gucheng Subdistrict, Suqian, in Sucheng District, Suqian, Jiangsu
Gucheng Subdistrict, Dengta, in Dengta City, Liaoning
Gucheng Subdistrict, Xingcheng, in Xingcheng City, Liaoning
Gucheng Subdistrict, Shouguang, in Shouguang City, Shandong
Gucheng Subdistrict, Taiyuan, in Jiancaoping District, Taiyuan, Shanxi
Gucheng Subdistrict, Linhai, in Linhai City, Zhejiang

Metro Stations 

 Gucheng station, a station on Line 1 of the Beijing Subway

Gucheng meaning "former city" (故城)

Counties
Gucheng County, Hebei (故城县), in Hengshui, Hebei

Towns
 Gucheng, Gucheng County, Hebei (故城镇)
 Gucheng, Wuxiang County (故城镇) in Shanxi

Other forms
 Gucheng County, Hubei (谷城县), in Xiangyang, Hubei
 Gucheng, Longyao County (固城镇) in Hebei
 Gucheng Township, Li County, in Gansu
 Gǔcheng Township, Qingfeng County, in Henan